Peter Helmut Ressel (born 4 December 1945 in Krommenie, North Holland) is a retired football winger from the Netherlands, who obtained three caps for the Dutch national team. He won the UEFA Cup with Feyenoord Rotterdam in 1974 by defeating Tottenham Hotspur, scoring the second goal in the 84th minute of the second leg to make the score 2–0, which secured Feyenoord's win. He also won the 1976 Cup-Winners Cup, 1976 European Super Cup and 1978 Cup-Winners Cup with RSC Anderlecht.

Ressel started his professional career for Go Ahead Eagles, then moved to NEC Nijmegen, PSV Eindhoven, Lierse SK (Belgium), Feyenoord Rotterdam, RSC Anderlecht 1975-78 (Belgium), San Jose Earthquakes (USA), AZ'67, Chicago Sting, KSC Hasselt, Telstar and FC VVV. He retired from professional football in the 1983–1984 season.

Honours

Player 
Feyenoord

 Eredivisie: 1973–74
 UEFA Cup: 1974
 Intertoto Cup: 1973

RSC Anderlecht

 Belgian Cup: 1975-76
 European Cup Winners' Cup: 1975–76 (winners), 1976-77 (runners-up), 1977–78 (winners)
 European Super Cup: 1976
 Amsterdam Tournament: 1976
Tournoi de Paris: 1977
 Jules Pappaert Cup: 1977
 Belgian Sports Merit Award: 1978

References

External links
  Profile
 NASL stats

1945 births
Living people
Dutch footballers
Association football wingers
AZ Alkmaar players
Belgian Pro League players
Chicago Sting (NASL) players
Dutch expatriate sportspeople in Belgium
Dutch expatriate footballers
Eredivisie players
Expatriate footballers in Belgium
Expatriate soccer players in the United States
Feyenoord players
Go Ahead Eagles players
Lierse S.K. players
NEC Nijmegen players
Netherlands international footballers
North American Soccer League (1968–1984) players
PSV Eindhoven players
R.S.C. Anderlecht players
San Jose Earthquakes (1974–1988) players
SC Telstar players
VVV-Venlo players
Footballers from Zaanstad
UEFA Cup winning players